Rothia mucilaginosa is a Gram-positive, coagulase-negative, encapsulated, non-spore-forming and non-motile coccus, present in clusters, tetrads or pairs that is a part of the normal oropharyngeal flora. Belonging to the family Micrococcaceae, it was first isolated from the mucous membrane of the cheek and gingiva. It is an oral commensal, that has been linked to causing severe bacteremia in immunocompromised patients. This bacterium has also been shown to form biofilms, similar to that of Pseudomonas aeruginosa. R. mucilaginosa is a cohabitant in the lower airways of patient with bronchiectasis

Morphology

Rothia mucilaginosa is a Gram-positive, coagulase-negative, encapsulated, non-spore-forming and non-motile coccus, present in clusters, tetrads or pairs. R. mucilaginosa can easily be confused for the bacteria from the genera Micrococcus and Staphylococcus. One way that it can be distinguished from those two is by its strong adherence to the solid medium substrate that its colonies form. Another way is by its weak or absent catalase reaction, failure to grow on 5% NaCl media or its glucose and sucrose fermentation.

Pathology

Rothia mucilaginosa  has been linked to Bronchiectasis, showing that an inhibition of the COX-2 inhibitor is largely related to an increased production of PGE2, which has been shown to be immunosuppressive in animal models of bacterial pneumonias and sepsis. The inhibition of COX-2 improved survival in mice, suggesting that the pathogenic effects of R. mucilaginosa are related to the induction of COX-2 It is also closely associated with Bacteremia, sepsis, and endocarditis.

Antibiotics

Rothia mucilaginosa is resistant to the quinolone class of antibiotics, with extreme resistance to fluoroquinolones. Sensitivity, as of 2003, is still found in trimethoprim-sulfamethoxazole, vancomycin and bacitracin.

References

Micrococcaceae